Adams Bridge or variations may refer to:

South Asia
Adam's Bridge (Ram Setu), limestone shoals between India and Sri Lanka, perhaps formerly constituting a land bridge

United States

Hal W. Adams Bridge, a suspension bridge in Florida
Adams Street Bridge, in Chicago, Illinois
Adams Covered Bridge, listed on the National Register of Historic Places (NRHP) in Ohio
Adams Mill Covered Bridge, listed on the NRHP in Indiana

See also
Damia Bridge, over the Jordan River between the West Bank and Jordan, also known as Adam Bridge
Adam Viaduct, railway underbridge in Wigan, United Kingdom
Rama Setu (Ramayana), a bridge built by Rama as described in the Ramayana, identified with Adam's Bridge
Sethubandhanam, another term for the above
Ram Setu (film), 2022 Indian film about the bridge
Sethubandhanam (disambiguation)
Sethu (disambiguation)
SETU (disambiguation)
Sethupathi (disambiguation)